Harley Fiona Riley (born 13 December 2001), better known by her stage name of Harley Bird, is an English actress. She was the third as well as the longest running voice of Peppa Pig, taking on the role in 2007 and leaving in 2020. The role was taken over by Amelie Bea Smith. She was Peppa Pig for 13 years.

Early and personal life
Harley Fiona Riley was born in Rochdale, Greater Manchester in Northern England. She lives in Tring, Hertfordshire, with her parents, Gill and Craig Riley. She is the second eldest of four children, and has two sisters and a brother. Bird attended Tring Park School for the Performing Arts on their Tring Park Associates programme before enrolling into the main school.

Career
At age five, she was signed to Alphabet Kidz Talent Agency. A month later she gained the voice role of Peppa in the children's animated series Peppa Pig. She replaced the previous actors, Lily Snowden-Fine and Cecily Bloom. She first voiced Peppa on the 2007 "Peppa's Christmas" special and continued to voice the character for seasons 3, 4, 5 and the first half of the 6th. She voiced Peppa Pig on "The Official BBC Children in Need Medley" and various other pieces of show merchandise.

Bird's TV appearances and radio broadcasts include a behind-the-scenes feature on CBBC's Newsround and an interview in character as Peppa on BBC Radio One's Chris Moyles Show. She became the youngest British Academy Film Award winner when she won the Performer award at the 2011 British Academy Children's Awards for her voice-artist work as Peppa Pig.

Bird announced that she was leaving the role of Peppa Pig on 31 January 2020, after 13 years and 185 episodes in the role. She was succeeded in the role by Amelie Bea Smith.

Bird starred as Daisy in Blueberry, a 2009 short film which won the Audience Award at the Cinequest Film Festival, She also starred as Piper alongside Saoirse Ronan in Kevin Macdonald's How I Live Now, released in 2013. She also starred in Goodbye, a radio drama by Morwenna Banks, her Peppa Pig co-star, that aired on BBC Radio 4 alongside Olivia Colman, Natascha McElhone, Darren Boyd, Alison Steadman, and John Simm. In 2017, Bird played the lead role of Sammy in Disney Channel's webisode series, So Sammy.

Filmography

References

External links

2001 births
Living people
Actresses from Greater Manchester
English child actresses
English television actresses
English voice actresses
People educated at Tring Park School for the Performing Arts
Actors from Rochdale
21st-century English actresses
People from Tring